Kastraki is a village in Kalabaka municipality, Trikala, Thessaly, Greece. It is located just northwest, within walking distance, of the main town of Kalabaka.

The village had a population of 1172 as of 2011. The administrative village occupies an area of 47.9 km2. Its elevation is 275 metres above sea level.

Etymology
The name Kastraki is derived from the word kastro, or Byzantine castle. The castle was built by Andronikos Palaiologos and stood until 1362. The castle is in ruins today.

History
During the early 1700s, Kastraki was formed from an amalgamation of hamlets called Rouxiori, Agia Paraskevi, Rigilavo, and Triskiano. These hamlets were founded by migrants from northern Epirus (i.e., southern Albania) who were fleeing from the Ottomans.

Description
The village has a central plaza and church, as well as various hotels and restaurants (tavernas) that cater to international tourists. An extensive network of trails connects Kastraki to various rocks and monasteries. The town of Kalambaka is a 20-minute walk away via the main road.

Rocks
Various rocks of the Meteora rock complex surround the village of Kastraki.

Rocks in the north
Dupiani (Δούπιανη)

Rocks in the east
Agio Pneuma (Άγιο Πνεύμα), site of the historic Hermitage of St. George of Mandila and Monks' Prison
Kumaries (Κουμαριές)
Toichos Alpha (Τοίχος Α)
Toichos Beta (Τοίχος Β)
Toichos Gamma (Τοίχος Γ)
Toichos Delta (Τοίχος Δ)
Surloti (Σουρλωτή)
Modi (Μόδι), site of the historic Monastery of St. Modestus
Alysos (Άλυσος) / Altsos (Άλτσος) / Alsos (Άλσος), site of the historic Monastery of the Apostle Peter's Chains

Rocks in the south
Pyxari (Πυξάρι), site of the historic Hermitage of Saint Gregory the Theologian (Ασκηταριά Αγίου Γρηγορίου του Θεολόγου), Hermitage of St. Anthony, and Hermitage of Chrysostomos. The Monastery of St. Apostoles (Μονή Αγίων Αποστόλων) is also nearby.
Badovas (Μπάντοβας), site of the historic Hermitage of St. Nicholas of Badovas
Ambaria (Αμπάρια)

References

Populated places in Trikala (regional unit)